Tragocephala cuneifera is a species of beetle in the family Cerambycidae. It was described by Per Olof Christopher Aurivillius in 1914. It is known from Angola.

References

Endemic fauna of Angola
cuneifera
Beetles described in 1914